Zaton LORPa is a rural locality (a selo) under the administrative jurisdiction of the Town of Olyokminsk in Olyokminsky District of the Sakha Republic, Russia, located  from Olyokminsk. Its population as of the 2010 Census was 4; down from 12 recorded in the 2002 Census.

References

Notes

Sources
Official website of the Sakha Republic. Registry of the Administrative-Territorial Divisions of the Sakha Republic. Olyokminsky District. 

Rural localities in Olyokminsky District